Steven Sims Jr. (born March 31, 1997) is an American football wide receiver for the Pittsburgh Steelers of the National Football League (NFL). He played college football at Kansas and signed with the Washington Redskins as an undrafted free agent in 2019.

Early years and college
Sims attended and played high school football at Travis High School. A 2-star recruit, Sims committed to Kansas over offers from McNeese State, Prairie View A&M, Southeastern Louisiana, Southern, and Stephen F. Austin. He played wide receiver, kick returner, and punt returner at Kansas from 2015 to 2018.

Statistics

Professional career

Washington Redskins / Football Team

Sims signed with the Washington Redskins as an undrafted free agent on April 30, 2019. He had his first career reception, a three-yard gain from Case Keenum, in a Week 2 loss to the Dallas Cowboys, along with three carries for sixteen yards. He had his first career touchdown, a 65-yard rushing touchdown, against the New England Patriots on October 6, 2019. In Week 12, he had his first kickoff return touchdown, for 91 yards, in a 19–16 win over the Detroit Lions, earning NFC Special Teams Player of the Week. In Week 16 against the New York Giants, Sims caught six passes for 64 yards and two touchdowns during the 41–35 overtime loss. Overall, Sims finished the 2019 season with 34 receptions for 310 receiving yards and four touchdowns.

He played the first three games of the 2020 season before being placed on injured reserve for a knee injury on October 9, 2020. He was activated off it on November 7. Sims played twelve games in the regular 2020 season and recorded 27 receptions for 265 yards and one touchdown. In his first playoff appearance, Sims caught three passes for 33 yards and recorded the only Washington receiving touchdown in the Wild Card Playoff game against the Tampa Bay Buccaneers. He was released on August 23, 2021.

Buffalo Bills
Sims signed with the Buffalo Bills on August 25, 2021, but was released on August 31 as part of final cuts.

Pittsburgh Steelers
On September 1, 2021, Sims signed with the practice squad of the Pittsburgh Steelers. He signed a reserve/future contract with the Steelers on January 19, 2022.

During the 2022 Season, Sims played in 12 games and recorded 14 receptions for 104 yards and 13 rushing attempts for 70 yards.

References

External links
Pittsburgh Steelers bio
Kansas Jayhawks bio

1997 births
Living people
Players of American football from Houston
American football wide receivers
Kansas Jayhawks football players
Washington Redskins players
American football return specialists
Washington Football Team players
Buffalo Bills players
Pittsburgh Steelers players